"Doja" is a song by British rapper and songwriter Central Cee. It was released as a single on 21 July 2022, Produced by LiTek and WhyJay. It went viral on TikTok for its lyrics, including references to its namesake, American singer and rapper Doja Cat. The song samples Eve's 2001 song featuring Gwen Stefani, "Let Me Blow Ya Mind". It debuted at number two on the UK Singles Chart and number one in New Zealand and Greece. With a video produced by Lyrical Lemonade, this release made Central Cee the first UK artist to have a video directed by Cole Bennett.

Lyrics
"Doja" received viral attention on TikTok for its lyrical references to American rapper and singer Doja Cat and for its repeated line "How can I be homophobic? My bitch is gay".

Composition
"Doja" samples the melody from Eve's "Let Me Blow Ya Mind" throughout the entire song.

Reception
David Renshaw of The Fader described the feel of the track as "more tactical than exploitative", which he wrote "is what (just about) saves the song from crashing into offensive territory". Renshaw also opined that the song touches on the "homoerotic undertones of gang culture" although finding that Central Cee does not explore these "observations" beyond mere mentions and that it "has achieved its express goal of grabbing as many eyeballs as possible".

Music video
The song was released alongside its music video, which was directed by Cole Bennett.

Charts

Weekly charts

Year-end charts

Certifications

References

2022 singles
2022 songs
Central Cee songs
Music videos directed by Cole Bennett
Number-one singles in Greece
Number-one singles in New Zealand
Songs written by Central Cee
LGBT-related songs
Cultural depictions of American women
Warner Records singles